On January 5, 1855, during the Liberal Revolution of 1854, at the La Palma hacienda, Ramón Castilla's troops defeated those of Echenique, who had to be sheltered in the house of the British charge d'affaires, Sullivan. The Government Palace, the President's house and the his wife's quinta were looted, as well as that of his relatives and his closest collaborators. Echenique then went into exile.

References 

Conflicts in 1855
January 1855 events